Asiakwa is a town in the East Akim District of the Eastern Region of Ghana.

The town includes a SOS Children's Village since 1992.

References

See also

Populated places in the Eastern Region (Ghana)